Marcia Ingram Jones Smoke (born July 18, 1941) is an American sprint canoer. She competed at the 1964, 1968 and 1972 Olympics and won a bronze medal in the K-1 500 m event in 1964.

A native of Oklahoma City, Oklahoma, Jones graduated from Michigan State University. She won three gold medals at the 1967 Pan American Games and a record 35 national championships and 24 North American championships.

Her husband, William Smoke, finished fourth in the second repechage event of the K-4 1000 m at the 1964 Summer Olympics in Tokyo. Jones' son, Jeff, finished seventh in the K-2 1000 m semifinal at the 2004 Summer Olympics in Athens. Her sister, the late Sperry Rademaker, finished seventh in the K-2 500 m event at the 1968 Summer Olympics in Mexico City.

References

1941 births
Living people
American female canoeists
Canoeists at the 1964 Summer Olympics
Canoeists at the 1968 Summer Olympics
Canoeists at the 1972 Summer Olympics
Michigan State University alumni
Olympic bronze medalists for the United States in canoeing
Sportspeople from Oklahoma City
Medalists at the 1964 Summer Olympics
Pan American Games gold medalists for the United States
Pan American Games medalists in canoeing
Competitors at the 1967 Pan American Games
Medalists at the 1967 Pan American Games
21st-century American women